Dame Louise Joyce Ellman  ( Rosenberg; born 14 November 1945) is a British politician who served as Member of Parliament (MP) for Liverpool Riverside from 1997 to 2019. She is a member of the Labour Party.

Ellman was elected as a councillor on the Lancashire County Council in 1970, becoming the Labour group leader in 1977 and leader of the council from 1981 until her election to House of Commons in 1997. She was Vice-Chair of Lancashire Enterprises, and served as Chair of the Transport Select Committee from 2008 to 2017. She was Chair of Labour Friends of Israel until February 2020 and was Honorary President of the Jewish Labour Movement.

She was appointed a Dame Commander of the Order of the British Empire (DBE) in the 2018 Queen's Birthday Honours List, and is a Vice President of the Jewish Leadership Council. Ellman resigned from the Labour Party in October 2019, expressing concern over allegations of antisemitism in the Labour Party and a potential Jeremy Corbyn-led government. She rejoined the party in 2021.

Early life and career

Louise Joyce Rosenberg was born in Manchester to an observant Jewish family. Her father had a Lithuanian background. She was educated at the independent Manchester High School for Girls, before studying at the University of Hull where she received a BA in Sociology and History in 1967, and then studied Social Administration at the University of York where she was awarded a MPhil in 1972.

As a teenager, she was involved in the Labour Zionist movement, Habonim and, following university, spent a year in Israel at an Ulpan studying Hebrew, where she met her husband.

From 1970 to 1976, she was a lecturer for the Open University. 

She was elected as a councillor on the Lancashire County Council in 1970, becoming the Labour group leader in 1977 and council leader from 1981 until her election to Parliament. She was Vice-Chair of Lancashire Enterprises.

She unsuccessfully contested the Darwen constituency at the 1979 general election, being defeated by the sitting Conservative MP Charles Fletcher-Cooke by 13,026 votes.

Parliamentary career
She was elected to Parliament at the 1997 general election for the safe seat of Liverpool Riverside. She held the seat with a majority of 21,799 and has held the seat comfortably at successive general elections. When she was re-elected in 2001, the turnout was the lowest in the country at 34.1%.

Positions and voting
She was a member of the Transport Committee and its predecessor, Transport, Local Government and the Regions, since she was first elected. On 21 May 2008, she was selected to become the Chair of the Commons Transport Select Committee after the death of Gwyneth Dunwoody MP, being returned unopposed after the 2015 general election.

According to website Public Whip, Ellman repeatedly voted for the Iraq War, against an investigation into that war, and for renewal of Trident, Britain's nuclear weapons programme. She very rarely voted against the Party line.

In the 2015 Labour Party leadership election, she nominated Liz Kendall.

She supported Owen Smith in the failed attempt to replace Jeremy Corbyn in the 2016 leadership election.

Israel
Ellman was Chair of the Jewish Labour Movement from 2006 to 2016, after which she became its Honorary President. She was also Vice Chair of Labour Friends of Israel and succeeded Joan Ryan as Chair in August 2019. She said that she intended to remain a member of LFI following her resignation from the Labour Party. She was the chair of the All-Party Britain-Israel Parliamentary Group.

The Times of Israel called her "tough-as-nails" and "an unabashed friend of Israel". According to one biographer in the Jewish Chronicle, "Ellman can always be called on to defend Israel on the green benches" (i.e. in Parliament). The Jewish Telegraph said "Doughty Labour MP Louise Ellman is never scared to openly proclaim her Jewish identity and fight for Israel and against Islamic extremism at every Parliamentary opportunity". In September 2019, Ellman said she "shared the fears" of other Jews living in the UK about the prospect of a Labour government led by Jeremy Corbyn and understood why they "would seriously consider leaving the country". In October 2019, she said "I'm not absolutely convinced he will bring great danger to the Jewish community but I'm very concerned it is possible he could".

Constituency party
In 2016, Ellman said that a small number among the members who joined her constituency Labour party after Corbyn's election as leader seemed "obsessed on Middle East issues", that there had been a "very unpleasant atmosphere" in constituency meetings and that remarks which she considered were antisemitic had been made to her. She also alleged that the local Momentum group was acting as a "party within a party" and asked for her constituency party to be suspended and investigated. A leading local Momentum member rejected the allegations.

Resignation
In early October 2019, a motion of no confidence in Ellman, scheduled to take place on Yom Kippur, the holiest day of the Jewish calendar, was submitted for discussion at a branch of her constituency Labour Party. The timing of the motion was criticised by Ellman herself, who called it "particularly insidious"; and by Marie van der Zyl, President of the Board of Deputies of British Jews, who said it meant that Ellman would have "no opportunity even to respond". A Labour Party spokesperson said that no confidence motions "had no formal standing", with another source intimating that the motion was unlikely to be taken to a vote. Two further motions of no confidence were later submitted for debate at other branches of the Liverpool Riverside CLP.  The North-West Labour Party office later advised local branches that none of the motions should be discussed, citing the potential prejudicial effect that such discussion may have on the upcoming trigger ballot.

On 16 October 2019, Ellman resigned from the Labour Party, citing her worries about antisemitism in the party, and her belief that anti-Semitism in the Labour Party had prospered under the leadership of Jeremy Corbyn. She wrote that "under Jeremy Corbyn's leadership, antisemitism has become mainstream in the Labour Party. Jewish members have been bullied, abused and driven out. Antisemites have felt comfortable and vile conspiracy theories have been propagated ... the overwhelming majority of the Jewish community is fearful of what a Corbyn government might mean for Britain's Jews ... [he is a man] who spent three decades on the backbenches consorting with, and never confronting, antisemites, Holocaust deniers and terrorists". Labour responded that "Jeremy Corbyn and the Labour Party are fully committed to the support, defence and celebration of the Jewish community and continue to take robust action to root out antisemitism in the party and wider society".

Her CLP later said: "The Labour Party recognises the hard work and commitment Louise has shown to her constituents over the past 22 years. Unfortunately she made it very clear at the last CLP meeting that she could not support a Jeremy Corbyn led government. This inevitably meant that Louise would be triggered and was very unlikely to win any reselection process". The CLP, in a further statement, explained the desire of many local members for a reselection contest as due to longstanding political differences over Ellman's support for the Iraq War, her lack of support for Corbyn's policies and criticisms of the leadership, and her recent expression of concern over a future Labour government. The CLP condemned antisemitism directed at Ellman or otherwise but characterised her as misrepresenting the local party and said that many of their Jewish members did not recognise or accept her views.

On 27 September 2021, Ellman announced she was rejoining the Labour Party. She expressed her satisfaction with Keir Starmer's leadership, saying he has “shown a willingness to confront both the anti-Jewish racists and the toxic culture which allowed antisemitism to flourish” in the party.

Personal life and recognition
Ellman has been married since 16 July 1967 to Geoffrey Ellman, a pharmacist. She lived in Leeds, then moved to Skelmersdale in 1969. The couple have a son, Sean, and a daughter, Yvonne, and five grandchildren.
(Her son Sean has repeatedly come to public attention for selling so-called 'legal highs' in his chain of 'head shops' across the northwest of England. In 2010 he was given an ASBO by a St Helens court to prevent such sales; in 2012 he was taken to court by authorities in Chester. Two years after his judge-directed acquittal on a legal technicality, the Sunday People newspaper exposed two more Ellman head shops in Manchester and Leeds, one for allegedly selling "synthetic cocaine".)

She was made a Dame Commander of the Order of the British Empire (DBE) in the 2018 Queen's Birthday Honours for parliamentary and political services.

In 2019, the Jerusalem Post ranked her as the 23rd most influential Jew worldwide, calling her 'Labour's lady who opposes Corbyn' and noting that 'she has been a strong advocate for Israel in the House of Commons'. She was the sole Briton on the 50-strong list.

She is a Vice President of the Jewish Leadership Council.

References

External links
  – official site
 
 Louise Ellman Ask Aristotle - article at Guardian Unlimited Politics
 Louise Ellman parliamentary biography from DodOnline
 Louise Ellman at Skelmersdale Heritage Society
 Louise Ellman  page on BBC Politics

Audio clips
 Mobile phones (2002)
 Middle East Road Map (October 2004)
 Ken Livingstone (February 2005)

1945 births
Living people
Members of Lancashire County Council
People educated at Manchester High School for Girls
Alumni of the University of Hull
Alumni of the University of York
British Zionists
Labour Friends of Israel
English Jews
Female members of the Parliament of the United Kingdom for English constituencies
Academics of the Open University
Politicians from Manchester
UK MPs 1997–2001
UK MPs 2001–2005
UK MPs 2005–2010
UK MPs 2010–2015
UK MPs 2015–2017
UK MPs 2017–2019
Jewish British politicians
Jewish women politicians
Members of the Parliament of the United Kingdom for Liverpool constituencies
20th-century British women politicians
21st-century British women politicians
Dames Commander of the Order of the British Empire
Independent members of the House of Commons of the United Kingdom
20th-century English women
20th-century English people
21st-century English women
21st-century English people
Women councillors in England